Constitutional Convention elections were held in Nauru on 19 December 1967.

Background
The Constitutional Convention consisted 27 elected members and the nine elected members of the Legislative Council. A total of 96 candidates contested the 27 elected seats. There were fewer than 1,000 registered voters.

Aftermath
The 36 members of the Convention met for the first time on 3 January 1968, with the purpose of drawing up a new constitution in preparation for independence later in the year.

Several issues were debated during the Convention's sitting, including whether the death penalty should be expressly banned by the new constitution (rejected by 26 votes to 8), whether the government should have the power to levy taxes (passed by 17 votes to 15), whether religious schools should be fully funded by the state (defeated by 15 votes to 12), and whether there should be an increase in the royalties from phosphate mining (passed by 14 votes to 12 but later overturned by a vote of 18 to 8).

On 29 January 1968 the Convention approved the new constitution unanimously. It provided for an 18-member Legislative Assembly with a three-year term. The Assembly would then appoint a five-member Council of State to exercise executive power.

References

Nauru
1967 in Nauru
Elections in Nauru
December 1967 events in Oceania